Potito Starace and Martín Vassallo Argüello were the defending champions. They were both present but did not compete together.
Starace partnered with Nicolás Massú, but lost in the semifinals to Oliver Marach and Michal Mertiňák.
Vassallo Argüello partnered with Albert Montañés, but lost in the first round to Óscar Hernández and Sergio Roitman.

Oliver Marach and Michal Mertiňák won in the final 6–2, 6–7(3–7), [10–7], against Agustín Calleri and Luis Horna.

Seeds

Draw

Draw

External links
 Draw

2008 Abierto Mexicano Telcel
Abierto Mexicano Telcel